Victor John-Charles (born Saint Lucia) is a British karateka.  He has an 8th Dan black belt in karate and is the winner of multiple individual and team medals at the World Championship, World Games and European Karate Championships. Vic Charles came 3rd in 1983 television competition Superstars. Vic Charles was awarded an MBE for Services to karate in the Queen's Birthday Honours List in 1989. This was the first time the sport of karate had been acknowledged in such a fashion. On retiring from competitive karate in 1990 Vic continued as Chief Instructor of British Sport Karate Association (B.S.K.A.) the Association he established in 1985. The Association dominated English karate competitions and won 2 European Club Team titles. The Association counted 3 World and European Champions as members Mervyn Etienne, Mike Sailsman, and Willie Thomas. Vic was appointed English National Coach in 1996 and became Technical Manager of the Performance Plan in 1997 until 1999. He was a member of the board of Karate England until 1999.

Achievements

 1977 European Karate Championships Team Gold Medal
 1978 European Karate Championships Kumite Silver Openweight
 1979 European Club Champion Team Gold Medal
 1979 European Karate Championships Kumite Bronze Openweight
 1980  World Karate Championships Team kumite Bronze Medal
 1981  World GamesKumite Gold Medal
 1981  European Karate Championships Kumite Gold Medal
 1982  European Karate Championships Kumite Gold Medal
 1984  European Karate Championships Kumite Gold Medal
 1984  European Karate Championships Team Bronze Medal
 1984  World Karate Championships Kumite Bronze Medal
 1984  World Karate Championships Team Gold
 1985 European Karate Championships Team Gold Medal
 1985  World Games Kumite Gold Medal
 1986  World Karate Championships Kumite Gold Medal
 1986  European Karate Championships Team Bronze Medal
 1987 European Karate Championships Team Bronze Medal
 1988  World Karate Championships Ippon Kumite Silver Medal
 1988  World Karate Championships Kumite Silver Medal
 1988  World Karate Championships Team Gold Medal
 1988 European Karate Championships Team Bronze Medal
 1989  European Karate Championships Kumite Silver Medal

COACHING ACHIEVEMENTS

 1997 Senior Europeans 1 Gold, 3 Bronze
 1997 Junior Europeans 1 Gold, 1 Silver, 3 Bronze
 1997 World Games 3 Gold, 1 Silver, 2 Bronze
 1997 World Cup 3 Gold 
 1997 British Championships 24 Gold, 25 Silver, 37 Bronze
 1997 Venice Cup 4 Gold, 4 Silver, 7 Bronze
 1998 Women's Cup 1 Silver, 1 Team Bronze
 1998 Junior Europeans 3 Silver, 3 Bronze
 1998 World Championship 1 Gold, 2 Team Silver, 2 Bronze
 1998 Senior Europeans 1 Team Gold, 2 Silver, 2 Bronze
 1998 Paris Open 2 Silver
 1998 Venice Cup 2 Gold, 4 Silver, 6 Bronze
 1998 Dutch Open 5 Gold, 2 Silver, 2 Bronze
 1999 Senior Europeans 1 Gold
 1999 Junior Europeans 2 Gold, 2 Bronze
 1999 Paris Open 2 Silver, 2 Bronze
 1999 Ville de Madrid 1 Team Bronze

British and English Titles

 1974 British Junior Championships Gold Heavyweight Medal
 1978 English Championships Gold Heavyweight Medal
 1978 English Championships Gold Openweight Medal
 1979 English Championships Gold Heavyweight Medal
 1980 English Championships Gold Heavyweight Medal
 1984 English Championships Gold Heavyweight Medal
 1985 English Championships Gold Heavyweight Medal
 1986 English Championships Gold Heavyweight Medal
 1987 English Championships Gold Team Medal
 1987 British Championships Gold Team Medal
 1987 British Club Championships Gold Team Medal
 1988 English Championships Gold Team Medal
 1989 English Championships Gold Team Medal

International and Association Titles

 1977 Czechoslovakia Heavyweight Gold Medal
 1977 Czechoslovakia Team Gold Medal
 1978 Dutch Open Heavyweight Gold Medal
 1978 Dutch Open Openweight Bronze Medal
 1979 Spanish Open Gold medal
 1980 Czechoslovakia Team Gold Medal
 1980 Inter City European Team Gold Medal
 1982 Superstars Champion Welsh Heats
 1983 Supertars Runner Up Bath
 1983 Superstars Runner Up 
 1983 Superstars British Championships Third Place
 1983 Superstars Swimming Record Holder
 1985 Paris Champion of Champions Silver Heavyweight Medal
 1985 Paris Champion of Champions Silver Openweight Medal
 1985 Commonwealth Championships Gold Openweight Medal
 1985 Commonwealth Championships Team Gold Medal
 1986 Commonwealth Sports Award

References

Living people
Wadō-ryū practitioners
British male karateka
English people of Saint Lucian descent
Black British sportspeople
World Games gold medalists
Competitors at the 1981 World Games
Competitors at the 1985 World Games
Year of birth missing (living people)
20th-century British people